Łapka  is a village in the administrative district of Gmina Barczewo, within Olsztyn County, Warmian-Masurian Voivodeship, in northern Poland.

Link
 Kreisgemeinschaft Allenstein-Land e.V.
 Kirchspiel Wartenburg in Ostpreussen

References

Villages in Olsztyn County